Çatlı is a Turkish surname. Notable people with the surname include:

 Abdullah Çatlı (1956–1996), Turkish convicted drug trafficker
 Cesar Catli (born 1982), Filipino basketball player

Turkish-language surnames